This is a list of collaborative code review software that supports the software development practice of software peer review.

References

Software review